A list of Latin American Academy Award winners and nominees appears below.

Best Picture

Best Director

Acting

Best Actor

Best Actress

Best Supporting Actor

Best Supporting Actress

Best Cinematography
This list focuses on Latin American-born cinematographers.

Best Costume Design
This list focuses on Latin American-born costume designers.

Best Documentary Feature
This list focuses on documentary features directed by Latin American-born filmmakers.

Best Documentary Short Subject
This list focuses on documentary short subject directed by Latin American-born filmmakers.

Best Film Editing
This list focuses on Latin American-born film editors.

Best International Feature Film

Best Animated Feature
This list focuses on animated features directed by Latin American-born filmmakers.

Best Live Action Short Film
This list focuses on live action short films directed/produced by Latin American-born filmmakers.

Best Animated Short Film
This list focuses on animated short films directed by Latin American-born filmmakers.

Best Makeup
This list focuses on Latin American-born makeup artists.

Best Music – Original Score
This list focuses on scores by Latin American-born composers.

Best Music – Original Song
This list focuses on songs by Latin American-born composers and/or lyricists.

Best Production Design
This list focuses on Latin American-born production designers and set decorators.

Best Sound or Sound Mixing
This list focuses on Latin American-born sound engineers.

Best Sound Editing
This list focuses on Latin American-born sond editors.

Best Visual Effects

Best Adapted Screenplay
This list focuses on Latin American-born screenplay writers.

Best Original Screenplay
This list focuses on Latin American-born screenplay writers.

Best Story
This list focuses on Latin American-born screenplay writers.

Note: Defunct category.

Special Awards

By Country

See also
Lists of Hispanic Academy Award winners and nominees by country

References

Latin America
Latin American cinema